Roger A. Keats (born August 12, 1948) is an American politician and businessman.

Keats was born in Cleveland, Ohio. He served in the United States Army from 1972 to 1974. He received his bachelor's degree from University of Michigan. He worked in the bank business and started Gallatan National a construction and civil engineer business. He lived in Wilmette, Illinois. At various points in his early career, Keats was a teacher and a legislative assistant in Washington D.C. He also served as the Republican campaign coordinator in Northern Illinois during 1972 general election.

In the 1976 general election, Republican incumbent Brian Duff opted to run for a judgeship in the Cook County Circuit Court. Keats was elected as one of three members, with John Porter and Harold Katz, from the 1st district to serve in the 80th General Assembly. Duff resigned before the end of the 79th General Assembly to assume his role as a judge. Local Republican leaders appointed Representative-elect Keats to the Illinois House to serve during the veto session of the 79th General Assembly. Keats served in the Illinois House of Representatives from 1976 to 1979. In 1977, incumbent Senator Brad Glass sought the Republican nomination for Illinois Treasurer. In the 1978 general election, Republican Keats defeated Democratic candidate Cathleen Quinn O'Rourke to succeed Glass in the Illinois Senate. He then served in the Illinois Senate from 1979 to 1993. In the 1992 general election, Keats lost the Republican-friendly 29th district to Democratic State Representative Grace Mary Stern.

In 1995, he was appointed to the Illinois International Port District by Governor Jim Edgar. During the 2008 Republican Party presidential primaries, Keats worked on behalf of the presidential campaign of former U.S. Senator Fred Thompson serving as a congressional district chair for Illinois's 10th congressional district. In 2010, Keats was the Republican nominee for President of the Cook County Board of Commissioners. In 2013, Keats and his wife moved to Dripping Springs, Texas.

Notes

1948 births
Living people
Politicians from Cleveland
Military personnel from Cleveland
People from Wilmette, Illinois
People from Dripping Springs, Texas
Businesspeople from Illinois
Republican Party members of the Illinois House of Representatives
Republican Party Illinois state senators
University of Michigan alumni